Vuyo Mbotho (born  in King William's Town, South Africa) is a South African rugby union player for the Border Bulldogs in the Currie Cup and the Rugby Challenge. His regular position is winger, but he has on occasion played as a fullback or outside centre.

Career

Border Bulldogs

In 2011, he was included in the  squad for the 2011 Currie Cup First Division.

At the start of 2012, he was selected for a Southern Kings side that played a trial match against the  prior to the latter's 2012 Super Rugby season, scoring two tries in a 33–20 defeat. He returned to action for the Bulldogs in the 2012 Vodacom Cup, scoring a single try in six starts, and made a further three appearances in the 2012 Currie Cup First Division.

Griffons

He played nine times for the side during the 2013 Currie Cup First Division season, failing to score any points as the Griffons finished in sixth spot.

He once again started all their matches in the 2014 Vodacom Cup and made a further five appearances during the 2014 Currie Cup qualification tournament, where the Griffons finished third to qualify for the 2014 Currie Cup First Division. He was a key member of their First Division-winning side. He played in the final and helped the Griffons win the match 23–21 to win their first trophy for six years.

References

South African rugby union players
Living people
1988 births
People from Qonce
Rugby union centres
Rugby union wings
Rugby union fullbacks
Border Bulldogs players
Griffons (rugby union) players
SWD Eagles players
Rugby union players from the Eastern Cape
Leopards (rugby union) players